Marshall County is a county in the U.S. state of South Dakota. As of the 2020 census, the population was 4,306. Its county seat is Britton. The county was created on May 2, 1885, and was named for Marshall Vincent, who homesteaded near Andover, South Dakota.

Geography

Marshall County lies on the north side of South Dakota. Its north boundary line abuts the south boundary line of the state of North Dakota. Its terrain consists of rolling hills, with numerous lakes and ponds in the SE portion. Its terrain slopes to the northeast, and its highest point is near its SE corner, at 2,034' (620m) ASL.

The county is drained by the Crow Creek, a tributary of the James River, and the Wild Rice River, a tributary of the Red River of the North. A portion of the Lake Traverse Indian Reservation is located in the eastern part of the county.

Major Highways
 South Dakota Highway 10
 South Dakota Highway 25
 South Dakota Highway 27

Protected areas
 Abraham State Game Production Area
 Aspen Slough State Game Production Area
 Black Slough State Game Production Area
 Bonham State Game Production Area
 Buffalo Lakes State Game Production Area
 Bullhead State Lakeside Use Area
 Cattail State Game Production Area
 Church State Game Production Area
 Clear Lake State Game Production Area
 Clear Lake State Lakeside Use Area
 Douglas State Game Production Area
 Eden State Game Production Area
 Flat Creek State Game Production Area
Fort Sisseton Historic State Park
 Fort Sisseton State Game Production Area
 Four Mile-Clubhouse-Barretts State Game Production Area
 Four Mile State Lakeside Use Area
 Hamilton Township State Game Production Area
 Hickman Dam State Game Production Area
 Horeshoe State Game Production Area
 Ivory Tower State Game Production Area
 Knebel State Game Production Area (part)
 Little Cottonwood State Game Production Area
 Lost Lake State Game Production Area
 Nine Mile State Game Production Area
 North Church State Game Production Area
 North Ottertail State Game Production Area
 North Red Iron State Game Production Area
 Renziehausen State Game Production Area (part)
 Rock Crandall State Game Production Area
 Roy Lake State Game Production Area
Roy Lake State Park
 Schlosser Memorial State Game Production Area
Sica Hollow State Park (part)
 Sorbell State Game Production Area
 South Red Iron State Game Production Area
 Turtlefoot State Game Production Area
 White Lake State Game Production Area

Adjacent counties

 Sargent County, North Dakota - north
 Richland County, North Dakota - northeast
 Roberts County - east
 Day County - south
 Brown County - west

Demographics

2000 census
As of the 2000 United States Census, there were 4,576 people, 1,844 households, and 1,252 families in the county. The population density was 6 people per square mile (2/km2). There were 2,562 housing units at an average density of 3 per square mile (1/km2). The racial makeup of the county was 92.59% White, 0.09% Black or African American, 6.32% Native American, 0.09% Asian, 0.22% from other races, and 0.70% from two or more races. 0.76% of the population were Hispanic or Latino of any race.

There were 1,844 households, out of which 29.80% had children under the age of 18 living with them, 57.20% were married couples living together, 6.50% had a female householder with no husband present, and 32.10% were non-families. 30.10% of all households were made up of individuals, and 16.10% had someone living alone who was 65 years of age or older. The average household size was 2.43 and the average family size was 3.04.

The county population contained 27.00% under the age of 18, 5.10% from 18 to 24, 22.80% from 25 to 44, 23.80% from 45 to 64, and 21.30% who were 65 years of age or older. The median age was 42 years. For every 100 females there were 100.00 males. For every 100 females age 18 and over, there were 96.80 males.

The median income for a household in the county was $30,567, and the median income for a family was $36,295. Males had a median income of $27,241 versus $17,872 for females. The per capita income for the county was $15,462. About 10.40% of families and 13.90% of the population were below the poverty line, including 19.00% of those under age 18 and 14.00% of those age 65 or over.

2010 census
As of the 2010 United States Census, there were 4,656 people, 1,815 households, and 1,154 families in the county. The racial makeup of the county was 85.4% white, 7.6% American Indian, 0.2% black or African American, 0.2% Asian, 5.6% from other races, and 1.1% from two or more races. Those of Hispanic or Latino origin made up 6.8% of the population. In terms of ancestry, 45.6% were German, 30.6% were Norwegian, 6.8% were Swedish, 5.8% were Irish, 5.2% were English, and 2.7% were American.

Of the 1,815 households, 24.4% had children under the age of 18 living with them, 52.8% were married couples living together, 6.0% had a female householder with no husband present, 36.4% were non-families, and 31.4% of all households were made up of individuals. The average household size was 2.36 and the average family size was 2.83. The median age was 43.2 years.

The median income for a household in the county was $41,023 and the median income for a family was $56,544. Males had a median income of $31,639 versus $26,737 for females. The per capita income for the county was $22,441. About 9.3% of families and 17.1% of the population were below the poverty line, including 27.6% of those under age 18 and 12.8% of those age 65 or over.

Communities

Cities
 Britton (county seat)
 Veblen

Towns
 Eden
 Lake City
 Langford

Census-designated place

 Clear Lake
 Kidder
 Newport Colony
 Sunset Colony
 Westwood Colony

Unincorporated communities

 Amherst
 Hillhead
 Marlow
 Newark
 Spain
 West Britton

Townships

Buffalo
Dayton
Dumarce
Eden
Fort
Hamilton
Hickman
La Belle
Lake
Lowell
McKinley
Miller
Newark
Newport
Nordland
Pleasant Valley
Red Iron Lake
Sisseton
Stena
Veblen
Victor
Waverly
Weston
White
Wismer

Politics
Marshall County voters have tended to vote Democratic for the past several decades. In 64% of the national elections since 1960, the county selected the Democratic Party candidate.

See also
 National Register of Historic Places listings in Marshall County, South Dakota

External links
 Marshall County, South Dakota (Official site)

References

 
1885 establishments in Dakota Territory
Populated places established in 1885